Brooks Stevens, Inc., also known as Brooks Stevens Design Associates and Brooks Stevens Design, is a product development firm headquartered in Allenton, Wisconsin. Brooks Stevens's services included research, industrial design, engineering, prototyping, project management,and graphic design.

History
Brooks Stevens Design was established by Clifford Brooks Stevens in 1935. In 1954, Brooks Stevens, the founder, popularized the term "planned obsolescence"   as a cornerstone to product evolution. The phrase was not intended to refer to building things that deteriorate easily, but to "instilling in the buyer the desire to own something a little newer, a little better, a little sooner. Stevens's philosophies have been said to define the industrial design profession.
The firm has designed products from toasters to automobiles and heavy equipment, including the 1949 Twin Cities Hiawatha and Olympian Hiawatha trains with the "Skytop Lounge".

In 2007, the founder's son, Kipp Stevens, retired and sold Brooks Stevens to Ingenium Product Development, expanding the company's product coverage and engineering capabilities.

Today, Brooks Stevens designs and engineers both consumer and heavy industrial products.

References

Further reading
 Povletich, Bill. "Brooks Stevens: Designing the American Dream". Wisconsin Magazine of History, vol. 97, no. 1 (Autumn 2013): 38-49.

External links
 Industrial designer Brooks Stevens examines the effect of WWII on auto design
 Brooks Stevens archives at the Milwaukee Art Museum
 Old Milwaukee: Brooks Stevens, Wienermobiles, and High Life, from Milwaukee Record

Design companies of the United States
Engineering companies of the United States
Companies based in Milwaukee